Tory's Cave may refer to:

 Tory's Cave (Springfield, Vermont)
 Tory's Cave (New Milford, Connecticut)